The Taliang knobby newt (Tylototriton taliangensis) is a species of salamander in the family Salamandridae. It is found only in southern Sichuan, China. It inhabits densely vegetated forested valleys, where it breeds in pools, ponds and paddy fields. It is a common species within its confined range.

References 

Tylototriton
Amphibians of China
Endemic fauna of Sichuan
Taxonomy articles created by Polbot
Amphibians described in 1950